Yash Gardharia (born 11 December 1996) is an Indian cricketer. He made his Twenty20 debut for Gujarat in the 2018–19 Syed Mushtaq Ali Trophy on 8 March 2019. He made his first-class debut on 19 January 2020, for Gujarat in the 2019–20 Ranji Trophy.

References

External links
 

1996 births
Living people
Indian cricketers
Gujarat cricketers
Place of birth missing (living people)